Good Intentions is a 1930 American pre-Code crime film directed by William K. Howard and written by George Manker Watters. The film stars Edmund Lowe, Marguerite Churchill, Regis Toomey, Earle Foxe, Eddie Gribbon and Robert McWade. The film was released on June 29, 1930, by Fox Film Corporation.

Cast        
Edmund Lowe as David Cressonn
Marguerite Churchill as Helen Rankin
Regis Toomey as Richard Holt
Earle Foxe as 'Flash' Norton
Eddie Gribbon as Liberty Red
Robert McWade as Cyrus Holt
Georgia Caine as Miss Huntington
Owen Davis Jr. as Bud Finney
Pat Somerset as Babe Gray
J. Carrol Naish as Charlie Hattrick 
Henry Kolker as Butler

References

External links 
 

1930 films
Fox Film films
American crime films
1930 crime films
Films directed by William K. Howard
American black-and-white films
1930s English-language films
1930s American films